Itthipol Nonsiri (born 15 April 1980) is a former Thai footballer. He was played for Thai Port FC and he was named club captain for the 2009 season.

He came on as a substitute in the 2010 Thai League Cup final and won a winner's medal after Thai Port defeated Buriram PEA F.C. 2–1.

Clubs

External links
 

Itthipol Nonsiri
1980 births
Living people
Itthipol Nonsiri
Association football defenders
Itthipol Nonsiri